The Serrano Water District is a California special district that maintains the groundwater of parts of eastern Orange County. The agency serves a 4.7 square mile area that encompasses the entirety of Villa Park and a small portion of Orange. The population served is approximately 6,500.

The agency was created in 1876 as the Serrano Irrigation District, making it one of the oldest standing water districts in Southern California. Serrano Water District helped to create the Santiago Dam and Irvine Lake. Currently, the agency owns their own water treatment plant, 50% of Irvine Lake, and 43 miles of pipeline. 

In 2019, Serrano Water District successfully negotiated with the county, OC Parks, and Irvine Ranch Water District to reopen Irvine Lake to public recreation.

References

Government in Orange County, California
Water management authorities in California
1876 establishments in California
Government agencies established in 1876